Viktor Shishkov (born 7 September 1986) is a Bulgarian footballer who plays as a forward for Pirin Gotse Delchev.

On 21 September 2017, Shishkov was appointed as assistant manager of Pirin Gotse Delchev.

References

External links

1986 births
Living people
People from Gotse Delchev
Bulgarian footballers
Association football forwards
PFC Pirin Gotse Delchev players
FC Alashkert players
PFC Beroe Stara Zagora players
FC Bansko players
FC Pirin Razlog players
FC Lokomotiv Gorna Oryahovitsa players
First Professional Football League (Bulgaria) players
Second Professional Football League (Bulgaria) players
Armenian Premier League players
Bulgarian expatriate footballers
Expatriate footballers in Armenia
Bulgarian expatriate sportspeople in Greece
Expatriate footballers in Greece
Sportspeople from Blagoevgrad Province